Ji Kyong-sun (born 28 December 1975) is a North Korean former judoka. She competed in the 2000 Summer Olympics. She later competed in the 2002 Asian Games.

References

1975 births
Living people
North Korean female judoka
Olympic judoka of North Korea
Judoka at the 2000 Summer Olympics
Asian Games medalists in judo
Judoka at the 1998 Asian Games
Judoka at the 2002 Asian Games
Asian Games silver medalists for North Korea
Medalists at the 2002 Asian Games